Edward Cooper (28 June 1883 – 15 July 1956) was an English actor who worked extensively in both Britain and Hollywood. Cooper generally played minor or supporting parts, but was occasionally given larger roles. He was married for 39 years to actress Ethel Griffies.

Partial filmography

 The Cost of a Kiss (1917)
 Go and Get It (1920)
 Shadows of Conscience (1921)
 Gay and Devilish (1922)
 The Hands of Nara (1922)
 Tillie (1922)
The Son of the Wolf (1922)
 Paradise (1926)
 Escapade (1932)
 Timbuctoo (1933)
 Clive of India (1935)
 The Imperfect Lady (1935)
 Head Over Heels (1937)
 On the Avenue (1937)
 Rose of Washington Square (1939)
 The Life and Death of Colonel Blimp (1943)

Bibliography
 Low, Rachael (ed.) The History of British Film (Volume 1): The History of the British Film 1896-1906;  (2004; reprinted 6 July 2011).

External links

1883 births
1956 deaths
English male film actors
English male stage actors
actors from Bolton
20th-century English male actors
British expatriate male actors in the United States